Thomas Andrew Harvey (born 1933) is a South African international lawn bowler.

Bowls career
He competed in the first World Bowls Championship in Kyeemagh, New South Wales, Australia in 1966  and won a bronze medal in the triples with Kelvin Lightfoot and Leon Kessel at the event.

Six years later he secured two bronze medals; one in the singles and another in the pairs with Brian Ellwood at the 1972 World Outdoor Bowls Championship in Worthing. He also won a silver medal in the team event (Leonard Trophy).

Family
His father Horace Harvey won the singles title at the 1938 British Empire Games and his grandfather Andrew Harvey competed in the pairs competition at the 1934 British Empire Games.

Personal life
He was a business partner in sports goods by trade.

References

1933 births
Living people
South African male bowls players